Syzygium amplifolium is a species of plant in the family Myrtaceae. It is endemic to Fiji.  It is threatened by habitat loss.

References

Endemic flora of Fiji
amplifolium
Vulnerable plants
Taxonomy articles created by Polbot